Nancy Langston is an American environmental historian, currently working as a professor in the Department of Social Sciences at Michigan Technological University. She was the President of the American Society of Environmental History from 2007 to 2009. Her initial research on the historical and spatial migrations of toxic contaminants within the Lake Superior basin was supported by the National Science Foundation, and has informed her most recent publication titled Toxic Bodies. Langston is a Marshall Scholar.

Langston's 2017 book is ''Sustaining Lake Superior: An Extraordinary lake in a changing world".

References 

Year of birth missing (living people)
Living people
21st-century American historians
Environmental historians
Michigan Technological University faculty
Presidents of the American Society for Environmental History